The men's 110 metres hurdles was the shorter of the men's hurdle races in the Athletics at the 1964 Summer Olympics program in Tokyo. It was held on 17 October and 18 October 1964. 38 athletes from 24 nations entered, with 1 not starting in the first round. The maximum number of athletes per nation had been set at 3 since the 1930 Olympic Congress. The first round was held on 17 October, with the semifinals and the final on 18 October. The event was won by Hayes Jones of the United States, the nation's seventh of nine consecutive victories and the 13th overall gold medal in the event for the Americans. Jones was the fifth man to win two medals in the event. For the first time since 1936, an athlete from outside the United States made the podium, as Anatoly Mikhailov of the Soviet Union took bronze to break the American streak of four consecutive podium sweeps and earn the first Soviet medal in the event.

Background

This was the 15th appearance of the event, which is one of 12 athletics events to have been held at every Summer Olympics. Two finalists from 1960 returned: bronze medalist Hayes Jones of the United States and sixth-place finisher Valentin Chistyakov of the Soviet Union. Jones and his countryman Blaine Lindgren were favored, with Willie Davenport giving the American team a solid chance at a fifth consecutive medal sweep.

The Ivory Coast, Malaysia, and Northern Rhodesia each made their first appearance in the event. The United States made its 15th appearance, the only nation to have competed in the 110 metres hurdles in each Games to that point.

Competition format

After one edition at four rounds in 1960, the format returned to the three-round format used since 1908. The semifinals and finals were expanded from 6 runners each to 8 runners each, however; in fact, the reduction in number of rounds was despite there being more hurdlers in 1964 than 1960. The 1964 competition also introduced the "fastest loser" system, used only in the first round at this edition. Previously, advancement depended solely on the runners' place in their heat. The 1964 competition added advancement places to the fastest runners across the heats in the semifinals who did not advance based on place.

The first round consisted of five heats, with 7 or 8 hurdlers each. The top three hurdlers in each heat, along with the next fastest overall, advanced to the semifinals. The 16 semifinalists were divided into two semifinals of 8 hurdlers each; the top four hurdlers in each advanced to the 8-man final.

Records

These were the standing world and Olympic records (in seconds) prior to the 1964 Summer Olympics.

No new world or Olympic records were set during the competition.

Schedule

All times are Japan Standard Time (UTC+9)

Results

Round 1

The top three runners in each of the 5 heats as well as the fastest remaining runner advanced.

Heat 1

Heat 2

Heat 3

Heat 4

Heat 5

Semifinals

The top four runners in each semifinal advanced to the final.

Semifinal 1

Davenport injured his thigh and finished seventh, ensuring that the streak of American podium sweeps would end at 4.

Semifinal 2

Final

References

Athletics at the 1964 Summer Olympics
Sprint hurdles at the Olympics
Men's events at the 1964 Summer Olympics